The STLD was established on 30 October 1974 as the Society of Television Lighting Directors to promote discussion on techniques and the use and design of equipment in the field of television production, and at its 35th AGM in March 2009 it became the Society of Television Lighting and Design.

With no union affiliations it is recognised as a platform for open discussion and demonstration of the craft  — and is run as a non-profit making organisation by an elected committee of volunteers for the benefit of its members.

Activities
Professional meetings are organised throughout the UK and abroad, on techniques, equipment and related subjects - and technical information together with news of members and their activities, are published three times per year in the Society's magazine Set and Light - making these meetings and magazine, together with the STLD website a recognised international resource  of information for the television lighting and design industry.

Membership
There are various levels of membership of the Society:

 A Full Member of the STLD is someone who is, or has been, engaged in the direction and design of the creative aspect of television lighting or design.

and affiliates may join as:

 A Student Member — someone studying the above on a recognised course and valid during the student's training period — this attracts a lower subscription fee - as do the rates for:
 Retired Member
 Overseas Member

 The STLD also welcomes companies associated with the television industry to become Sponsor Members of the Society.

Set and Light
Set and Light is the journal of the society, published three times per year and reporting on its events and the activities of members and sponsors. The publication was formerly known as Television Lighting and then TV Lighting and Design.

The magazine was started in 1974. Its editor has been Emma Thorpe since 2012.

References

External links
Official STLD website

Television organisations in the United Kingdom
Entertainment industry societies
Television Lighting and Design
Non-profit organisations based in the United Kingdom
1974 establishments in the United Kingdom
Organizations established in 1974